Ferhat Çerçi (born 2 September 1981 in Hamm) is a German football manager and former football player. He played for Hammer SpVg. He also holds Turkish citizenship. He spent one season in the Bundesliga with Arminia Bielefeld.

He is currently the manager of Hammer SpVg II.

References

External links
 
 

1981 births
Living people
Sportspeople from Hamm
German footballers
Turkish footballers
Rot Weiss Ahlen players
Arminia Bielefeld players
Kocaelispor footballers
Stuttgarter Kickers players
German people of Turkish descent
Kickers Emden players
Bundesliga players
2. Bundesliga players
Association football midfielders
Hammer SpVg players
Footballers from North Rhine-Westphalia
SV Lippstadt 08 players